Piney Township is one of twenty-one current townships in Carroll County, Arkansas, USA. As of the 2010 census, its total population was 226.

The township was established in 1875, taking its name from the Piney Creek which runs through it.

Geography

References
 United States Census Bureau 2008 TIGER/Line Shapefiles
 United States Board on Geographic Names (GNIS)
 United States National Atlas

 Census 2010 U.S. Gazetteer Files: County Subdivisions in Arkansas

External links
 US-Counties.com
 City-Data.com

Townships in Carroll County, Arkansas
Townships in Arkansas